Charlotte Makgomo (née Mannya) Maxeke (7 April 1871 – 16 October 1939) was a South African religious leader, social and political activist; she was the first black woman to graduate with a university degree in South Africa with a B.Sc from Wilberforce University Ohio in 1903, as well as the first black African woman to graduate from an American university.

Early life

Charlotte Makgomo (née Mannya) Maxeke was born in Ga-Ramokgopa, Limpopo on 7 April 1871 and grew up in Fort Beaufort, Eastern Cape. She was the daughter of John Kgope Mannya, the son of headman Modidima Mannya of the Batlokwa people, under Chief Mamafa Ramokgopa and Anna Manci, a Xhosa woman from Fort Beaufort. Mannya's father was a roads foreman and Presbyterian lay preacher, and her mother a teacher. Mannya's grandfather served as a key adviser to the King of the Basothos. Soon after her birth, Mannya's family moved to Fort Beaufort, where her father had gained employment at a road construction company. Details about Mannya's siblings are unclear, however, she had a sister known as Katie, who was born in Fort Beaufort. Mannya's date of birth is in dispute, with possible dates ranging from 1871, 1872 to 1874. The Minister of Home Affairs of South Africa, Naledi Pandor, took special interest in this detail of Charlotte Maxeke's life, however, no records were found. The date in 1871 is also often accepted as it does not conflict with the age of her younger sister Katie who was born in 1873.

At age 8, she began her primary school classes at a missionary school taught by the Reverend  in Uitenhage. She excelled in Dutch and English, mathematics and music. She spent long hours tutoring her less skilled classmates, often with great success. Reverend Wauchope credited Mannya with much of his teaching success particularly with regard to languages. Mannya's musical prowess was visible at a young age. Describing Charlotte's singing Rev. Henry Reed Ngcayiya, a minister of the United Church and family friend said: "She had the voice of an angel in heaven."

From Uitenhage, Charlotte moved to Port Elizabeth to study at the Edward Memorial School under Headmaster Paul Xiniwe. Charlotte excelled and completed her secondary school education in record time, achieving the highest possible grades. In 1885, after the discovery of diamonds, Charlotte moved to Kimberley with her family.

Foreign travel

After arriving in Kimberley in 1885, Charlotte began teaching fundamentals of indigenous languages, to expatriates and basic English to African "boss-boys". Charlotte and her sister Katie joined the African Jubilee Choir in 1891. Her talent attracted the attention of Mr. K. V. Bam, a local choir master who was organizing an African choir to tour Europe. Charlotte's rousing success after her first solo performance in Kimberley Town Hall immediately resulted in her appointment to the Europe-bound choir operation, which was taken over from Bam by a European. The group left Kimberley in early 1896 and sang to numerous audiences in major cities of Europe. Command royal performances, including one at Queen Victoria's 1897 Jubilee at London's Royal Albert Hall, added to their mounting prestige. According to the African Feminist Forum, the two women were treated like novelties, which made them uncomfortable. At the conclusion of the European tour, the choir toured North America. The choir managed to sell out venues in Canada and the United States.

During the choir's tour of the United States, the group was abandoned by their escort in Cleveland. Bishop Daniel A. Payne, of the African Methodist Church (AME) in Ohio, a former missionary in the Cape, organized the churchgoers to provide for the abandoned troupe's continued stay in America. Although the choir wished to attend Howard University, they were made to settle for a church scholarship to Wilberforce University, the AME Church University in Xenia, Ohio, in US. Mannya accepted the offer. At the university, she was taught under W.E.B Du Bois, a major Pan-Africanist. After obtaining her B.sc degree from the Wilberforce University in 1903, she became the first black South African woman to earn a degree.

It was at Wilberforce that Mannya met her future husband, Dr. Marshall Maxeke, a Xhosa born on 1 November 1874 at Middledrift. The couple lost a child prior to their marriage, and did not have any children thereafter. The couple married in 1903.

Political activism and later life

Charlotte became politically active while in the African Methodist Episcopal Church, in which she played a part in bringing to South Africa. While in the AME Church, Maxeke was heavily involved in teaching and preaching the Gospel and advocating education for Africans of South Africa. The church later elected her president of the Women's Missionary Society.

Shortly after her return to South Africa in 1902, Maxeke began her involvement in anti-colonial politics. She, along with two other individuals from Transvaal, attended an early South African Native National Congress meeting, and was one of the few women present. She was notably the first South African Social worker, appointed as Welfare Officer to the Johannesburg Magisterial Court and involved in juvenile work. Maxeke attended the formal launch of the South African Native National Congress in Bloemfontein in 1912. Maxeke also became active in movements against pass laws through her political activities. During the Bloemfontein anti-pass campaign, Maxeke served as an impetus towards eventual protest by organizing women against the pass laws.

Many of Maxeke's concerns were related to social issues as well as ones that concerned the Church.
Charlotte wrote about the political as well as social issues that women face in isiXhosa. In the writing piece "Umteteli wa Banti" she wrote about these specific issues.

Due to her activity in anti-pass laws demonstrations, Maxeke was led to founding the Bantu Women's League (BWL) which later became part of the African National Congress Women's League, in 1918. The BWL under Maxeke was a grassroots movement that served as a manner of taking up grievances from a largely poor and rural base. Maxeke's BWL also demanded better working conditions for women farm workers, however these were largely ignored by the white authorities. Furthermore, Maxeke led a delegation to the then South African Prime Minister, Louis Botha, to discuss the issue of  passes for women. These discussions resulted in a protest against passes for women the following year. Maxeke and an army of 700 women marched to the Bloemfontein City Council, where they burned their passes. 
She addressed an organisation for the voting rights of women called Women's Reform Club in Pretoria and further joined the council of Europeans and Bantu's. Maxeke was elected as the president of the Women's missionary society. Maxeke participated with protests related to low wages at Witwatersrand and eventually joined the Industrial and Commercial Workers Union in 1920. Maxeke’s leadership skills led her to be call by the South African Ministry of Education to testify before several government commissions in Johannesburg on matters concerning African education— a first for any African of any gender. She continued to be involved in many multiracial groups fighting against the Apartheid System and for women's rights.

Maxeke's husband, Marshall Maxeke, passed away in 1928. The same year Maxeke set up an employment agency for Africans in Johannesburg and also would begin service as a juvenile parole officer. Maxeke remained somewhat active in South African politics until her death, serving as a leader of the ANC in the 1930s. Maxeke was also instrumental in the foundation of the National Council of African Women, which served as a way of protecting the welfare of Africans within South Africa. Maxeke died in 1939 in Johannesburg at the age of 68.

Legacy
Maxeke's name has been given to the former "Johannesburg General Hospital" which is now known as the "Charlotte Maxeke Johannesburg Academic Hospital". The South African Navy submarine SAS Charlotte Maxeke is named after her. Maxeke is often honoured as the "Mother of Black Freedom in South Africa".

There is an ANC nursery school named after Charlotte Maxeke.  A statue of her stands in Pretoria’s Garden of Remembrance, in South Africa. At an event in 2015 dedicated to International Women's Day at Kliptown's Walter Sisulu Square, the Gauteng Infrastructure Development MEC plans to convert Maxeke's home into a museum and interpretation centre. German engineers referred to 3 South African submarines as "heroine class". These submarines were named after three powerful South African women namely, S101 (named SAS Manthatisi, after a female warrior of the Chief of the Batlokwa tribe), S102 (named after Charlotte Maxeke) and S103 (named after the South African rain queen as SAS Queen Modjadji) 

The ANC also hosts an annual Charlotte Maxeke Memorial Lecture.
Beatrice Street in Durban was changed to Charlotte Maxeke Street in her honour.
Maitland Street in Bloemfontein was renamed Charlotte Maxeke Street in honour of her contribution to South Africa.

See also
Defiance Campaign
Bloemfontein anti-pass campaign

References
Songs of Zion: The African Methodist Episcopal Church in the United States and South Africa, James T. Campbell, 1995, Oxford: Oxford University Press.
Beauty of the Heart: The Life and Times of Charlotte Mannya Maxeke, Zubeida Jaffer, 2016, Bloemfontein: Sun Press.
Ana Stevenson and Claire Cooke, "Recovering the Transnational Life of Charlotte Maxeke: An Interview with Zubeida Jaffer." Safundi: The Journal of South African and American Studies 19, no. 1 (2018): 9-15.

External links
Charlotte Maxeke
”Social Conditions Among Bantu Women and Girls”. Address by Charlotte Maxeke at the Conference of European and Bantu Christian Student Associations at Fort Hare, June 27-July 3, 1930 [Extract]

1871 births
1934 deaths
People from the Eastern Cape
Xhosa people
Wilberforce University alumni